HMAS Tambar was an auxiliary minesweeper operated by the Royal Australian Navy (RAN) during World War II.

Service history
Built in 1912 by the Greenock and Grangemouth Dockyard Company, Grangemouth for the North Coast Steam Navigation Company. She was sold in 1919 to the British New Guinea Development Company, in 1928 to the Tasmanian Government and later to Holyman & Sons. Tambar was requisitioned by the RAN and commissioned as an auxiliary minesweeper. On 4 March 1942, HMAS Tambar was fired on and hit by the Examination Battery at Fort Cowan Cowan, Moreton Island.  Two crew were killed outright and another later died of his wounds. She was returned to her owners in 1946.

Fate
Tambar was scrapped in Melbourne in 1960.

References

Notes

Further reading

1912 ships
Ships built in Scotland
Auxiliary ships of the Royal Australian Navy
Maritime incidents in March 1942
Coastal passenger vessels of Australia
Iron and steel steamships of Australia
Minesweepers of the Royal Australian Navy